Chimé Rigdzin Rinpoche (1922-2002), popularly known as C. R. Lama,  was an Indian lama of Tibetan Buddhism who was the lineage holder of the Northern Treasures tradition in the Nyingma school of Tibetan Buddhism.

Biography
At the age of four he was recognized and enthroned as the 4th incarnation of Khordong Terchen Nüden Dorjé Dropen Lingpa
() the main  re-incarnate lama of Khordong Monastery in Kham, Tibet, located in today's Sichuan province. At seven years old he had already started discovering spiritual treasures (terma) hidden by Padmasambhava 
He was mostly trained by Tülku Tsurlo (1895-1954) and completed his education at the age of 19 with the degree of Dorje Lopön Chenpo. Shortly after  he left the monastery to enter into a traditional three-year retreat at Tsö Pema (Rewalsar) in India. Following that he visited many Buddhist pilgrimage sites in Tibet, Sikkim, Bhutan and India as a wandering ngakpa. Later he settled with his family in Kalimpong, West Bengal and became an Indian citizen. From 1954 to 1987 C. R. Lama was head of the Department for Indo-Tibetan studies at Visva-Bharati University in Santiniketan, West Bengal. In the late 1950s he was invited by Giuseppe Tucci to teach in Rome. During that time he met Pope John XXIII. In the following year he was invited to teach at Ludwig Maximilian University of Munich by Helmut Hoffman. During the 1970s he had a number of American and European students at Visva-Bharati University, including James Low and Ngakpa Chögyam, who also became his religious disciples.

After his retirement in 1987, C.R. Lama regularly visited Europe, where he guided a small groups of pupils in different countries.

Literature

References

Further reading

External links
 H.H. Khordong Terchen Tulku Chhimed Rigdzin Rinpoche: Short Biography at Khordong.de
 The Chhimed Rigdzin Society and Gompaland 

1922 births
2002 deaths
20th-century lamas
Nyingma lamas
Nyingma tulkus
People associated with Santiniketan
Rinpoches
Tertöns
Tibetan Buddhists from Tibet
Tibetan emigrants to India
Tibetologists
Academic staff of Visva-Bharati University